Nipus is a genus of lady beetles in the family Coccinellidae. There are at least four described species in Nipus.

Species
These four species belong to the genus Nipus:
 Nipus biplagiatus Casey, 1899
 Nipus niger Casey, 1899
 Nipus occiduus Gordon, 1970
 Nipus planatus Gordon, 1970

References

Further reading

 
 

Coccinellidae
Coccinellidae genera
Articles created by Qbugbot